Lahore–Wagah Branch Line is one of several branch lines in Pakistan, operated and maintained by Pakistan Railways. The line begins from Lahore Junction station and ends at Wagah station, at border to India. There are 6 railway stations from Lahore Junction to Wagah. The original line continued on to Amritsar. Today the line is used for the Samjhauta Express train.

See also
Karachi–Peshawar Railway Line
Railway Lines in Pakistan

References

Railway stations on Lahore–Wagah Branch Line
5 ft 6 in gauge railways in Pakistan